McArthur Lake and variations may refer to:

Canada
 Lake McArthur (British Columbia), a lake in Yoho National Park
 McArthur Lake (Northwest Territories), a lake east of Great Slave Lake
 McArthur Lake (Ontario), a lake south of the city of Timmins
 McArthur Lake (Saskatchewan), a lake east of Pelican Narrows, Saskatchewan
 Lac McArthur (Val-des-Monts), a lake in Quebec

United States
 McArthur Lake (Idaho), a reservoir in Idaho
 McArthur Lake Wildlife Corridor, a wildlife corridor in Idaho
 McArthur Lake Wildlife Management Area, a protected area in Idaho
 McArthur Lake (Fort Bragg), a reservoir in North Carolina

See also
 List of lakes named McArthur, includes variations such as "MacArthur's Lake" in Australia
 McArthur (disambiguation)